Rova may refer to:

 Rova, Domžale, a village in the municipality of Domžale in Slovenia
 Rova (Madagascar), a type of fortified royal complex found throughout the highlands of Madagascar
 Rova of Antananarivo, a royal-palace complex in Antananarivo that served as the seat of government in pre-colonial Madagascar
 ROVA, the Rest of Virginia, a term referring to the portion of Virginia not including Northern Virginia
 Rova Saxophone Quartet
 The Rova (HaRova HaYehudi),  the Jewish Quarter in Jerusalem
 Rova (app), a digital audio streaming app associated with MediaWorks Radio in New Zealand
 Rova (river), Kola Peninsula, Murmansk Oblast, Russia

People with the surname
 Adele Rova (born 1996), Fijian swimmer
 Cheyenne Rova (born 1995), Fijian swimmer